The Tenth Circuit Act of 1863 was a federal statute which increased the size of the Supreme Court of the United States from nine justices to ten, and which also reorganized the circuit courts of the federal judiciary. The newly created Tenth Circuit consisted of California and Oregon, and addressed the judicial needs of the newly created western states. The Act became effective on March 3, 1863, during the Lincoln administration.

History 

The period of the American Civil War and the immediate aftermath of Reconstruction saw shakeups in the Court and in legislation concerning its size.  This culminated in the Judiciary Act of 1869, the last piece of legislation which altered the size of the Supreme Court.  Pursuant to the Tenth Circuit 1863 Act, Stephen Johnson Field was installed in the newly created Associate Justice seat. Shortly thereafter, Salmon P. Chase replaced Roger B. Taney as Chief Justice of the United States, and in 1865 Associate Justice John Catron died; Catron's vacancy would never be refilled as a consequence of the Judicial Circuits Act of 1866.  Later Supreme Court vacancies in the coming years would be addressed by the 1869 Act, which permanently fixed the size of the Supreme Court at nine.

The Court's full-strength size of ten was therefore a very brief historical aberration, straddling the end of the Taney Court (its final composition) and the beginning of the Chase Court (its first composition).  This "court of ten" thus experienced the following changes.  First, Field was appointed to its tenth seat, creating its first composition.  Next, Taney died and was replaced with Chase, creating its second composition.  Finally, Catron's death and his seat's subsequent abolition ended the "court of ten".

References

1863 in American law
United States federal judiciary legislation
History of the Supreme Court of the United States
37th United States Congress